Bittinger may refer to:

Bittinger (surname)
Bittinger, Maryland, an unincorporated community in Garrett County, Maryland, United States
Bittinger, Pennsylvania, an unincorporated community in Adams County, Pennsylvania, United States